Barzah may refer to:
 Barzah (31°31'33"N 35°44'53"E), Jordan
 Barzah (31°34'0"N 35°46'0"E), Jordan
 Barzah, Saudi Arabia
 Barzah-e Khuran, Iran
 Barzeh, Syria, a neighborhood to the north of Damascus, Syria.